Send More Paramedics is an English zombie film-influenced crossover thrash band from Leeds, West Yorkshire, England. They are named after a line in the film Return of the Living Dead.

Biography
The name is a reference to a line in the 1985 horror/comedy Return of the Living Dead. The band originally formed as a side project of Leeds emo band And None of Them Knew They were Robots, but have gained a higher profile than And None of Them Knew They Were Robots, who have since split up.

The band played in the 1980s crossover style, described as "Zombiecore...a fusion of 80s thrash and modern hardcore punk", with lyrics about zombies and cannibalism, and were heavily influenced by zombie movies. On stage, they dressed as zombies and the drummer donned a Mexican wrestling mask (a homage to the character in Brian Clement's Meat Market films with whom he also shares the name El Diablo). As part of this on-stage persona, band members claimed to be members of the living dead.

The band performed at the 2005 Download Festival, the 2006 Reading and Leeds Festivals, were one of the first acts confirmed for 2006's Damnation Festival and were the opening act for Avenged Sevenfold at the Camden Underworld. They also toured as support to The Offspring. Their live show was described by Drowned in Sound as "brilliantly ghoulish" and "mouth-agape entertainment of the highest quality".

Disc 2 of their 2006 album, The Awakening, is a concept disc, a zombie movie soundtrack, similar to the soundtrack in George A. Romero's Dawn of the Dead.

They won the 'fresh meat' competition on Zane Lowe's BBC Radio 1 show, leading to a "Guerilla Gig Live" performance on BBC Three. The video for which has recently been re-uploaded to YouTube.

The band's third album, The Awakening, featured guest appearances from Jeff Walker and Ken Owen from Carcass.

The band announced their impending split in a Myspace blog in June 2007, which read:

The band briefly reformed in early 2014 to play TDON 10, a one-day indoor festival celebrating 10 years of 'Thirty Days of Night Records', also on the bill were; Azriel, Everette, Crossbreaker, Broken Teeth, Martyr Defiled, Grader, Public Domain, Iron Witch, Opium Lord, and Set Astray. They also performed two other shows in a short run. Complete dates as follows:

"Live For Never - 2014"

11th April - Leeds, Wharf Chambers (Secret warm-up gig) - Support from: ATTACK! VIPERS and Iron Witch

12th April - Leeds, Vox (TDON 10)

10th May - Camden Barfly - Support from: Pure Graft and The Dead Anyways

Announced 13 June 2020 was a 'legacy' Instagram page for the band, which is currently accepting photo and video submissions, it read:

Dear puny humans,

You should check out and follow this unofficial fan-run legacy Instagram page: @sendmoreparamedicsuk

Created and curated by the maniacal mortal Dan P, it seems to be a catacomb for loads of undead images and info.

Oh and do please contribute to the depository - get in touch with Dan on the Instagram page if you’re able to share any live photos or flyers etc!

Medico

x

The band plans to reunite to perform 4 ‘one-off’ shows to celebrate their 20th anniversary in October 2021.

Dates as follows:

Thursday 28th October: Boom - Leeds

Friday 29th October: Boom - Leeds

Saturday 30th October: Boom - Leeds

Sunday 31st October: The Dome - London

On 25 June 2021 the band announced via their social media pages they had begun work on a 4th album, their first in 15 years. 
The album, entitled The Final Feast was released digitally on 17/09/21.

Members
 B'Hellmouth (Sam) - Vocals
 Medico (Duncan) - Guitar
 X. Undead (Martyn) - Bass
 El Diablo (Stuart) - Drums

Discography

Albums
2002 - A Feast for the Fallen (In at the Deep End Records/Violent Change Records)
2004 - The Hallowed and the Heathen (IATDE Records/Hellbent Records)
2006 - The Awakening (IATDE Records)
2021 - The Final Feast (Self-Released, digital only)

Split albums
2005 - Tales Told by Dead Men with Zombie Apocalypse (IATDE Records/Hellbent Records)
2005 - North of England, South of Heaven EP with The Nothing (Thirty Days of Night Records)

Compilation albums
2007 - Send More Paramedics (Self-Released) - A cassette collection of unreleased tracks/covers and a re-release of the band's first demo produced by Jason Sanderson

Video albums 

 2002 - Live at the Feeding Grounds (IATDE Records) - A video CD given away free with the first 50 mail orders of the 'A Feast for the Fallen' album on IATDE Records

Demos 

 2001 - Demo (Self-Released) - A cassette initially given away prior to the bands first (and at the time only) show, which led to their signing to IATDE records

Live albums

2020 - Undead at the BBC (Self-Released, digital only)

Music videos
Send More Paramedics have made three music videos, "Zombie Crew," "Nothing Tastes Like This," and "Blood Fever," which is the third and most recent. The promo for "Blood Fever" was released 16 February 2007 on the director's site:. The video is inspired loosely by the '80s horror film Night of the Demons and was directed by Adam Powell.

Contributed tracks to
Thrashing Like a Maniac (Earache Records compilation, 2007)

Movie references
Many Send More Paramedics songs reference zombie movies. Below is a table outlining these references. (incomplete)

References

External links
Official Send More Paramedics website
Send More Paramedics at Leeds Music Scene

Musical groups established in 2001
Musical groups disestablished in 2007
Crossover thrash groups
Horror punk groups
Hardcore punk groups from Leeds